One from the Modern is the fourth album by Ocean Colour Scene.

The album made a departure from the two previous albums Moseley Shoals and Marchin' Already, and is slower and sadder. It was panned by critics who accused it of being too commercial and labelled it "dad rock". The album was dismissed by David Belcher of The Herald, who commented on its "strangled vocals" and  "cringe-worthy lyrics." Nicholas Barber writing for The Independent concurred saying: "Much of the blame must rest on Simon Fowler. His mangled vocals and nonsense lyrics suggest that he doesn't know what it is he wants to communicate."

The protest song "Profit in Peace" was the first single, with "So Low" and then a double release of "I Am the News"/"July". The song "Soul Driver" is dedicated to Paul Weller, who mentored the band.

The album's cover photograph was taken in the Yew Garden at Packwood House near Lapworth, Warwickshire, a National Trust Property.

Track listing
"Profit in Peace" – 4:14
"So Low" – 3:54
"I Am the News" – 4:03
"No-one at All" – 3:34
"Families" – 3:11
"Step by Step" – 2:34
"July" – 2:56
"Jane She Got Excavated" – 3:35
"Emily Chambers" – 2:40
"Soul Driver" – 3:44
"The Waves" – 6:08
"I Won't Get Grazed" – 2:51

Charts

Weekly charts

Year-end charts

References

External links

One from the Modern at YouTube (streamed copy where licensed)

Ocean Colour Scene albums
1999 albums
Island Records albums